Typhoon Doug, known in the Philippines as Typhoon Ritang, was the only Category 5 typhoon in the 1994 Pacific typhoon season. The 13th storm and the second super typhoon of the season, it formed on the eastern end of a monsoon trough and developed into a tropical depression on August 2. It moved west and rapidly strengthened. Doug made landfall near Shanghai, China as a weak tropical depression. Doug killed 26 people and caused $110 million (1994 USD) damage in Taiwan. Doug's effects reached Korea.

Meteorological history

A tropical disturbance west-northwest of Guam on the eastern end of a monsoon trough was first noted  and developed into a tropical depression on August 2. It further intensified and became a tropical storm a few hours later, and the Joint Typhoon Warning Center (JTWC) assigned the system the name Doug. Doug further intensified and attained typhoon status about 18 hours later. An eye was becoming visible as Doug attained typhoon status.

Super Typhoon Doug tracked northwest over the next few days and brushed northern Taiwan early on August 8. In Taiwan 26 were killed and four were reported missing. Some 126 houses collapsed and 453 others were damaged. Electricity and water supplies to 100,000 people were cut off. Flood-related damages contributed to an estimate of more than 4 billion New Taiwan dollars (1994 NT$). Super Typhoon Doug then took on a north to northeast track over the East China Sea after sweeping across northern Taiwan and started to weaken. Doug weakened to a severe tropical storm on August 9 and was downgraded to a tropical storm further on August 10. Over the next couple of days, Doug made a clockwise loop over the Yellow Sea before making landfall over Shanghai on August 11. Doug became extratropical later that day. The remnants of Doug dissipated on August 12.

Impact
The typhoon killed 10 people and injured 41 others as the storm caused landslides that buried houses. Trees toppled and cars were swept off the road. Three people were missing and 300 were made homeless.

A Korean Air (KAL) Airbus A300, KAL 2033 skidded off the runway and exploded after trying to land on the island of Cheju, but all 160 aboard escaped without serious injury. The crew pushed the passengers down the escape chutes through the smoke and into the rain. The Cheju medical clinic treated seven passengers and one crew member for minor injuries.

In total, 26 people died and damage was estimated on Taiwan was placed at $110 million (1994 USD) in the wake of Super Typhoon Doug.

References

External links

1994 Pacific typhoon season